Les Mauvais Garçonnes (レ・モーヴェ・ギャルソンヌ) was Japanese cover rock band under the Giza Studio label in years 2001-2002.

History
On 9 May 2001, they've made debut with cover single Ai no Sanka (愛の賛歌). The original song Hymne à l'amour is performed by singer (Édith Piaf. The translation lyric provided Tokiko Iwatani. B side track consist of two remixes. In the media, it was broadcast as an commercial song for a drink Love and Peach. Their debut single was smash hit, it reached #40 on Oricon Weekly Charts and it sold more than 30,000 copies.

In September they've announced the series of 3 cover singles released each month. The main jacket cover will be picture of their mascot French bulldog Luna.

On 3 October, they've released second cover single Idol wo Sagase (アイドルを探せ). B side track consist of two remixes. The original song: La plus belle pour aller danser is performed by French singer Sylvie Vartan).

On 7 November, they've released third cover single Sans toi ma mie (サン・トワ・マミー). B side track consist of two remixes. The original song Sans toi ma mie is performed by Belgian singer Salvatore Adamo.

On 5 December, they've released fourth and final cover single Barairo no Jinsei (バラ色の人生). The intro and outro are performed not in Japanese but in French. B side track consist of three remixes. The original song La Vie en rose is performed by Édith Piaf.

The following singles didn't achieve as big success as debut single and as result failed to rank on Oricon Weekly charts.

On December, their debut single was included in Giza Studio's compilation album Giza Studio Masterpiece Blend 2001.

In March 2002, after releasing first compilation cover album Ai no Sanka, the band activities has vanished. It's unknown whenever they've disbanded or are on hiatus, no official statement was never published.

Members
 NAGANO TOMOKA – vocals
  – vocals
  – guitar

Discography 
All four singles have been arranged by Sakae Yamaguchi and two album tracks by Akihito Tokunaga.

Singles

Studio album

Compilation album

Magazine appearances
From Music Freak Magazine:
Vol.78 2001/5 (Ai no Sanka interview)
Vol.83 2001/10 (Idol wo Sagase interview)
Vol.84 2001/11 (Sans toi ma mie interview)
Vol.85 2001/12 (Barairo na Jinsei interview)
Vol.88 2002/3 (Album Ai no Sanka liner notes)

References

External links
Official Website with Giza name 

Being Inc. artists
Japanese pop music groups
Musical groups established in 2001
Musical groups disestablished in 2002
2001 establishments in Japan
Cover bands